BESE may refer to:
 The Louisiana Board of Elementary and Secondary Education
 A digital media platform founded by Zoe Saldana